Amblyseiella is a genus of mites in the Phytoseiidae family.

Species
 Amblyseiella denmarki (Zaher & El-Brollosy, 1986)
 Amblyseiella rusticana (Athias-Henriot, 1960)
 Amblyseiella setosa Muma, 1955

References

Phytoseiidae
Acari genera